Splenogonadal fusion-limb defects-micrognathia syndrome, also known by its abbreviation, SGFLD syndrome, is a rare genetic disorder characterized by abnormal fusion of the spleen and the gonad (splenogonadal fusion) alongside limb defects and orofacial anomalies. It is a type of syndromic dysostosis.

Children with this condition typically have abnormal fusion of the spleen and the gonad, amelia (or any kind of severe shortening of a limb), microglossia, cleft palate, bifid uvula, micrognathia. Additional symptoms include cryptorchidism, anal stenosis, anal atresia, pulmonary hypoplasia, and congenital heart defects.

This condition is highly fatal, fetuses/children with this condition are more likely to either be stillborn or die in infancy.

This condition is congenital, although an exact inheritance pattern isn't known. OMIM proposes it to be autosomal dominant.

Around 30 cases of SGLD have been described in medical literature. Most of them were male.

References 

Congenital disorders of musculoskeletal system
Congenital disorders of genital organs
Rare diseases